Rome II may refer to:

 Rome II Regulation, governing choice of law in the European Union in disputes about non-contractual obligations
 Rome II, part of the Rome process about the diagnosis and treatment of functional gastrointestinal disorders
 Total War: Rome II, a 2013 strategy video game

See also
 Nova Roma (disambiguation)
 Second Rome (disambiguation)
 New Rome (disambiguation)
 Rome (disambiguation)
Second Vatican Council 
University of Rome Tor Vergata, also known as the University of Rome II
Season 2 of Rome (TV series)